Cofton Common is a small area of Birmingham, England, located near Longbridge on the border with Worcestershire.

Areas of Birmingham, West Midlands